The Ukraine national beach soccer team represents Ukraine in international beach soccer competitions and is controlled by the FFU, the governing body for football in Ukraine.

Fixtures and results

Legend

2022

Current coaching staff
Coach: Mykola Kostenko

Current squad
The following 12 players were called up for two friendly matches against  on 1 October and 2 October 2022.

Competitive record

FIFA Beach Soccer World Cup Qualification (UEFA)

Honours
FIFA Beach Soccer World Cup Best: Sixth place
2005
Euro Beach Soccer League: Winners
2016
Euro Beach Soccer Cup: Winners
2007
FIFA Beach Soccer World Cup qualifying tournament: Winners
2011

References

External links
BSWW Profile

Beach soccer in Ukraine
National sports teams of Ukraine
European national beach soccer teams